Louise Raggio (June 15, 1919 – January 23, 2011) was a Texas lawyer for more than fifty years. She was the first female prosecutor in Dallas County, Texas. She spearheaded a coalition to establish the Marital Property Act of 1967 (which went into effect on January 1, 1968), and the Texas Family Code.

Early life
Louise Hilma Ballerstedt was born into a German immigrant family on June 15, 1919 at her grandmother's home in Austin, Texas. She attended the University of Texas, where she earned her bachelor's degree summa cum laude in 1939. She married Grier Raggio, who was then a government lawyer, in 1941. During her years of raising three sons she attended Southern Methodist University at night earning her law degree by 1952.

Career
Louise Raggio found a job working as an assistant district attorney in Dallas County in 1954 and was put in charge of child support, delinquent fathers, juvenile court and family law. While working as a prosecutor, she learned that married women had fewer rights in Texas than single women, i.e. married women in Texas had limited property rights and couldn't take out bank loans or start their own businesses without their husband's approval. One of her quotes in the KERA Texas  TrailerBlazer about her sums up the situation of a woman at the altar in Texas: "When a man and woman got married, they were one, and he was the one."

Louise Raggio began to fight for the rights of women and became the first female prosecutor in Dallas County, Texas.

Death
Louise Raggio died on January 23, 2011.

Notes

References
 "Texas Tornado" The Life of a Crusader for Women's Rights and Family Justice", by Louise Ballerstedt Raggio and Vivian Anderson Castleberry, Kensington Publishing Corp, New York City: 2003;

External links
 Official website
 Texas Women Lawyers website

1919 births
2011 deaths
20th-century American women lawyers
American prosecutors
People from Austin, Texas
People from Dallas
Place of death missing
Southern Methodist University alumni
University of Texas at Austin alumni
Texas lawyers
20th-century American lawyers
21st-century American women